Magno Prado Nazaret (born January 17, 1986) is a Brazilian professional racing cyclist, who currently rides for UCI Continental team .

Major results
Source: 

2005
 3rd Time trial, National Under-23 Road Championships
2006
 Pan American Road Championships
1st  Under-23 time trial
2nd  Time trial
 3rd Time trial, National Road Championships
 3rd Overall Volta de Porto Alegre
2007
 3rd Overall Vuelta Ciclista Líder al Sur
 3rd Overall Volta do Rio de Janeiro
2008
 1st Young rider classification, Tour de San Luis
 3rd Overall Giro do Interior São Paulo
2010
 1st Stage 5b (ITT) Rutas de América
2011
 1st  Time trial, National Road Championships
 1st Stage 4 Tour do Rio
2012
 1st  Overall Vuelta del Uruguay
1st Stage 8 (ITT)
 1st  Overall Tour do Brasil
1st Stage 3 (ITT)
 2nd  Time trial, Pan American Road Championships
2014
 1st  Overall Tour do Brasil
1st Stages 3 & 4 (ITT)
2015
 1st  Time trial, National Road Championships
 1st  Time trial, Military World Games
2017
 1st  Time trial, National Road Championships
 1st  Overall Vuelta del Uruguay
1st Stage 6 (ITT)
 8th Overall Tour of China II
 8th Overall Tour of Taihu Lake
2019
 1st  Overall Vuelta a la Bebida
1st Stage 1

References

External links

1986 births
Living people
Brazilian male cyclists
Brazilian road racing cyclists
Cyclists at the 2007 Pan American Games
Cyclists at the 2019 Pan American Games
Cyclists at the 2012 Summer Olympics
Olympic cyclists of Brazil
People from Dourados
Pan American Games medalists in cycling
Pan American Games silver medalists for Brazil
Medalists at the 2019 Pan American Games
Sportspeople from Mato Grosso do Sul
20th-century Brazilian people
21st-century Brazilian people